Knock at the Cabin is a 2023 American apocalyptic psychological horror film written and directed by M. Night Shyamalan, who wrote the screenplay from an initial draft by Steve Desmond and Michael Sherman. It is based on the 2018 novel The Cabin at the End of the World by Paul G. Tremblay, the first adaptation of one of his works. The film stars Dave Bautista, Jonathan Groff, Ben Aldridge, Nikki Amuka-Bird, Kristen Cui, Abby Quinn, and Rupert Grint. In the film, a family vacationing at a remote cabin are suddenly held hostage by four strangers, who demand something unimaginable.

Knock at the Cabin premiered in New York City at the Rose Hall on January 30, 2023, and was theatrically released in the United States on February 3, 2023, by Universal Pictures. The film received generally positive reviews from critics and has grossed over $54 million worldwide.

Plot
Seven-year-old Wen is vacationing with her fathers, Eric and Andrew, at a remote cabin in rural Pennsylvania. While catching grasshoppers, Wen is approached by a stranger named Leonard. Initially friendly, he explains that he needs Wen and her parents' help to save the world. However, Wen becomes suspicious when three other people appear with makeshift weapons. Wen flees to warn Eric and Andrew, but the visitors break into the cabin and tie them up, with Eric sustaining a concussion.

Leonard and his companions—Sabrina, Adriane, and Redmond—claim that they have never met before this day and have no intention of harming the family. However, in the past week, they have been driven by visions and an unknown force to find the family. The group foresees an impending apocalypse in which Leonard claims oceans will rise, a pandemic will spread, the sky will fall, and darkness will envelop the earth. The only way to prevent this is for the family to sacrifice one of their own. They are warned that, although they will survive the apocalypse, if they do not make a choice, they will be the last people alive. Eric and Andrew suspect that the intruders are lying and that the attack is motivated by hatred and delusion.

When the family refuses to make a choice, the intruders sacrifice Redmond by covering his head with a cloth and beating him to death with their weapons. A concussed Eric sees a figure of light as Redmond dies. On television, media reports show devastating megatsunamis, which Leonard declares is the beginning of the apocalypse. Andrew believes he recognizes Redmond as Rory O'Bannon, a man who had been arrested after assaulting Andrew in a bar years prior. Andrew thinks Rory tracked him down for revenge and manipulated the others to go along with his ruse. Leonard, Sabrina, and Adriane question Andrew's assumption and grapple with their guilt, but still hold onto their visions. They reveal that Redmond's death has unleashed the first judgment of humanity. The next day, the visitors sacrifice Adriane as the family remains indecisive. The disasters continue as a deadly flu virus, to which children are particularly vulnerable, spreads across the world.

Andrew insists the disasters are coincidental and that the intruders were anticipating a pre-scheduled news broadcast. Andrew escapes, retrieves his gun from his car, and shoots at Sabrina until she flees. He finds Redmond's wallet and proves to Leonard that he was Rory. With their tires slashed, Andrew believes the intruders came in a truck nearby and suggests they use it to escape. As Leonard is being held at gunpoint, Sabrina breaks into the house and is fatally shot by Andrew. Leonard overpowers Andrew, taking his gun. Leonard decapitates Sabrina and the broadcast shows spontaneous plane crashes occurring around the world.

Realizing their time is nearly over, Leonard leads the family to the back deck as the sky darkens. Leonard informs them that after his death, they will only have a few minutes to make a decision before slashing his own throat. Upon his death, lightning causes fires and more planes to crash. Eric does now believe the events are real, and that the intruders represent the Four Horsemen of the Apocalypse. Not wanting Wen to grow up in a destroyed world, Eric offers himself as the sacrifice. He reveals that during Redmond's sacrifice, he saw a vision of an older Andrew and an adult Wen thriving in the future that prevented the apocalypse. Eric feels that their family was chosen to make the sacrifice because their love was so pure. Reluctantly, Andrew shoots and kills Eric before lightning strikes, setting the cabin on fire.

Andrew and Wen find the visitors' truck with belongings that corroborate their stories. They drive to a crowded diner nearby, where they watch news reports confirming that the disasters have subsided. Returning to the truck, the radio turns on and plays "Boogie Shoes" by KC and the Sunshine Band, coincidentally the song that Eric had played for them on their drive to the cabin. They drive off, returning into the world.

Cast
 Dave Bautista as Leonard Brocht
 Jonathan Groff as Eric
 Ben Aldridge as Andrew
 Nikki Amuka-Bird as Sabrina
 Rupert Grint as Redmond
 Abby Quinn as Adriane
 Kristen Cui as Wen
 M. Night Shyamalan as an infomercial host

Production

Knock at the Cabin is an adaptation of the 2018 horror novel The Cabin at the End of the World by Paul Tremblay, who had signed an option with FilmNation Entertainment in late 2017, prior to the book's publication, and had to keep secret that the film was based on one of his novels until July 2022. The Black List and GLAAD List listed the initial draft by Steve Desmond and Michael Sherman as one of the most popular unproduced screenplays of 2019. While another director was briefly attached, M. Night Shyamalan read the original screenplay and grew interested in producing. Shyamalan later rewrote the script and came on board to direct the project as part of the two-film partnership between Universal Pictures and his production banner Blinding Edge Pictures. Old (2021) was the first film in that deal, with Knock at the Cabin being the second. The first draft was halfway completed by July 2021, and the title was revealed in October. Shyamalan said the script was the fastest he had ever written in his career.

Castings were announced from December 2021 to July 2022. They included Dave Bautista, Rupert Grint, Nikki Amuka-Bird, Ben Aldridge, Jonathan Groff, and Abby Quinn. Shyamalan cited Bautista's performance in Blade Runner 2049 (2017) as the reason he wanted him to star in Knock at the Cabin. Principal photography took place in Burlington County, New Jersey, from April 19 to June 10, 2022, with cinematographers Jarin Blaschke and Lowell A. Meyer. Shyamalan shot the film with 1990s lenses to give it an "old-school thriller" look. During post-production, Herdís Stefánsdóttir composed the score.

The film received an R-rating from the Motion Picture Association for "violence and language", making it Shyamalan's second film to receive that rating after The Happening (2008).

Release
Knock at the Cabin premiered in New York City at Rose Hall on January 30, 2023. The film was theatrically released on February 3, 2023, by Universal Pictures. The release was originally set for February 17 before being brought forward by two weeks as to avoid competition with Ant-Man and the Wasp: Quantumania.

Reception

Box office
, Knock at the Cabin has grossed $35.4 million in the United States and Canada, and $18.7 million in other territories, for a worldwide total of $54.1 million.

In the United States and Canada, the film was released alongside 80 for Brady, and was projected to gross $15–17 million from 3,643 theaters in its opening weekend. The film made $5.4 million on its first day, including $1.5 million from Thursday night previews. It went on to debut to $14.2 million, displacing Avatar: The Way of Water from atop the box office. The film made $5.5 million in its second weekend (a drop of 61%), finishing in sixth, and $3.9 million in its third weekend.

Critical response
On review aggregator Rotten Tomatoes, the film has an approval rating of 67% based on 318 reviews with an average rating of 6.3/10. The site's critical consensus reads, "Although it's often less than scary and parts of the story don't bear scrutiny, Knock at the Cabin is a thought-provoking chiller and upper-tier Shyamalan." Metacritic, which uses a weighted average, assigned the film a score of 63 out of 100, based on 60 critics, indicating "generally favorable reviews". Audiences surveyed by CinemaScore gave the film an average grade of "C" on an A+ to F scale, while those polled by PostTrak gave it a 56% positive score, with 35% saying they would definitely recommend it.

Reviewing for RogerEbert.com, Nick Allen gave the film two out of four stars, commending the "rich and earthy" cinematography and Bautista's "disarming" performance, but ultimately finding the film "frustrating and self-serious", adding "M. Night Shyamalan should probably just stay away from the apocalypse." Charlotte O'Sullivan of the Evening Standard found "many plot holes" in the film, adding, "The deeper issue, though, is that the supposedly complex home-invaders aren't given enough space to become interesting." Wendy Ide for The Observer wrote, "As the film's bleak momentum builds, so does a tsunami swell of existential dread. It's Shyamalan's most contained and efficient picture in a while." Stef Rubino for Autostraddle felt that "Like all of Shyamalan's greatest features, what unfolds throughout the course of the film is a family drama but on the grandest of scales."

References

External links
 
 

2023 films
2023 horror films
2023 LGBT-related films
2020s American films
2020s English-language films
2020s psychological horror films
American LGBT-related films
American psychological horror films
Apocalyptic films
Blinding Edge Pictures films
Films about children
Films about vacationing
Films based on American horror novels
Films directed by M. Night Shyamalan
Films produced by M. Night Shyamalan
Films set in Pennsylvania 
Films shot in New Jersey
Films with screenplays by M. Night Shyamalan
Gay-related films
LGBT-related horror films
Universal Pictures films